Terellia ceratocera is a species of tephritid  or fruit flies in the family Tephritidae.

Distribution
This species can be found from Britain up to western Siberia and central Europe (Albania, Andorra, Austria, Belgium, Britain, Bulgaria, Central European Russia, Czech Republic, Denmark, East European Russia, eastern Palearctic realm, Estonia, Finland, France, Germany, Italy, Lithuania, Norway, Poland, Romania, Slovakia, Sweden, Switzerland and the Netherlands), Balkans, Turkey and Kazakhstan.

Description
These fruit flies have frons, thorax and legs yellow. Eyes are blue-green. The anterior portion of the mesonotum bears a dull black mark. Katepistemum shows a black triangular mark. Pedicel of the males is greatly enlarged. The abdomen is dark orange with paired black marks on tergites 4 and 5. Wings bear four distinct and straight dark bands.

Biolib
These flies are monophagous, feeding only on Asteraceae. In fact larvae of this species lives only in the capitulum of Centaurea scabiosa and Centaurea alpestris. They pupate in the soil. From the eggs laid one year may develop adults in the same year or in the spring of the following year.

References

External links
  Insecta.pro

Tephritinae
Diptera of Europe
Insects described in 1913